Alex Pinardi (born 5 September 1980) is an Italian footballer.

Career
Pinardi began his career in the Primavera team of Atalanta and was, in July 1997, promoted to the Serie A team.

After seven years in the Serie A with Atalanta, he signed in the summer  of 2004 for fellow Serie A club Lecce. He scored six goals in 57 games for Lecce and then signed in the summer of 2006 for Modena. On 18 June 2010 Cagliari signed the offensive midfielder from Modena on a two-year contract for free.

After just 7 games, Pinardi was signed by Serie B side Novara for €460,000 fee in a -year contract. On 30 January 2012 he was loaned to Vicenza for the rest of the 2011-12 season, and then sold for the next season. Novara sold Pinardi for €1 million, signing Alain Baclet also for €1 million in exchange. Pinardi signed a 3-year contract.

In January 2013 he was signed by Cremonese in a temporary deal.

On 17 July 2013 Pinardi was signed by FeralpiSalò in a temporary deal. In May 2014 he had an operation on his posterior cruciate ligament. On 23 June 2014 Pinardi was signed outright in a 1-year contract. On 22 May 2015 Pinardi signed a new 1-year contract with FeralpiSalò.

International career
Pinardi played for the Italy national football teams in the U-17 (all in friendlies), U-20 and U-21 levels.

References

1980 births
Sportspeople from the Province of Brescia
Living people
Italian footballers
Italy youth international footballers
Italy under-21 international footballers
Atalanta B.C. players
U.S. Lecce players
Modena F.C. players
Cagliari Calcio players
Novara F.C. players
L.R. Vicenza players
U.S. Cremonese players
FeralpiSalò players
Association football midfielders
Serie A players
Serie B players
Serie C players
A.S. Giana Erminio players
Footballers from Lombardy